The Prestige Jazz Quartet is an eponymous album by the group nominally by jazz vibraphonist Teddy Charles recorded in 1957 for the Prestige label.

Reception

The Allmusic review by Thom Jurek stated "This is as fine a jazz record as you are likely to come by from 1957 (and there were many great ones from that year); it's too bad the band didn't remain together longer to explore further the terrain mapped out on this debut".

Track listing
All compositions by Teddy Charles except as indicated
 "Take Three Parts Jazz" - 14:23
 "Meta-Waltz" (Mal Waldron) - 5:28
 "Dear Elaine" (Waldron) - 8:53
 "Friday the 13th" (Thelonious Monk) - 8:53  
Recorded at Van Gelder Studio, Hackensack, New Jersey on June 22, 1957 (tracks 1, 3 & 4) and June 28, 1957 (track 2)

Personnel 
Teddy Charles - vibraphone
Mal Waldron - piano
Addison Farmer - bass
Jerry Segal - drums

References 

1957 albums
Prestige Records albums
Teddy Charles albums
Albums recorded at Van Gelder Studio